Hydrotherosaurus (meaning "water beast lizard") is an extinct genus of elasmosaurid plesiosaur from the Upper Cretaceous (Maastrichtian stage) Moreno Formation of Fresno County, California, USA. The only known species, H. alexandrae, was named for its discoverer, Annie Montague Alexander, by Samuel Paul Welles.

Description
 
It has one of the longest necks relative to total length among elasmosaurids, with 60 vertebrae in total.

See also

 List of plesiosaur genera
 Timeline of plesiosaur research

References

Sources
 

Late Cretaceous plesiosaurs of North America
Fossil taxa described in 1943
Elasmosaurids
Taxa named by Samuel Paul Welles
Sauropterygian genera